D-threonine aldolase (D-TA, DTA, low specificity D-TA, low specificity D-threonine aldolase) is an enzyme with systematic name D-threonine acetaldehyde-lyase (glycine-forming). This enzyme catalyses the following chemical reaction

 (1) D-threonine  glycine + acetaldehyde
 (2) D-allothreonine  glycine + acetaldehyde

This pyridoxal-phosphate protein is activated by divalent metal cations (e.g. Co2+, Ni2+, Mn2+ or Mg2+).

References

External links 
 

EC 4.1.2